Jagdale is an Indian surname. Notable people with the surname include:

Madhavsinh Jagdale (1914–1990), Indian cricketer
Ashok Jagdale (born 1945), Indian cricketer, son of Madhavsinh
Sanjay Jagdale (born 1950), Indian cricketer, son of Madhavsinh

Surnames of Indian origin